Canadian military policy with respect to LGBT sexuality has changed in the course of the 20th century from being intolerant and repressive to accepting and supportive.

CFAO 19-20
In May 1967, due to the passing of the CF Reorganization Act (C-90) the Canadian Forces issued Canadian Forces Administrative Order (CFAO) 19-20, Sexual Deviation - Investigation, Medical Investigation and Disposal, which required members of the military suspected of being homosexual to be investigated and then subsequently released. These investigations carried out by the Special Investigation Unit made use of the fruit machine, a device created by Dr. Frank Robert Wake of Carlton University in the 1960s. This device was created with the objective of identifying perceived and actual homosexuals in the Canadian military in order to protect the organization from blackmail by Soviet Union spies. Based on the results of the fruit machine evaluation, members of the CF were removed, having their careers ruined, their privacy invaded, and their lives destroyed.

Within the Military Police (MP), a Special Investigation Unit (SIU), based in Halifax, was in charge of purging the gays from the Armed Forces (18). For the MPs, to chase homosexuals was an obsession in the name of National Security during the Cold War against the Soviet Union.

The procedure against a “gay suspect” starts with the local MPs making a complete search of his quarters on the Base or apartment in town—without a warrant. Meanwhile the SIU interrogates the suspect’s co-workers, and anyone knowing him in his hometown, college, or university, asking direct and embarrassing questions (19).

The gay suspect is then summoned by the SIU for interrogation (20). The purpose is to obtain a confession of being gay, and no less important, to name other gays in the Services. The sessions can last several hours while two MP play the game of good/bad cops. The later threatens the suspect with a court-martial, jail term, force labor (for the Navy), a dishonorable discharge, all of that with insults and humiliating comments until he/she has confessed. The right of an advocate is simply ignored. Fabricated proofs and false testimonies are common. Questions are asked about private sexual practices. Then the good cop explains that if the suspect “cooperates”, he will avoid these traumatic predicaments and could leave the Service quietly. Most of the time, the gay suspect cooperates to end this “mental torture” and to avoid further public embarrassment. But following his confession, the “suspect“ becomes ipso facto “accused” of being gay, and therefore receives “rapidly” (CFAO, art. 7) a dishonorable discharge from the Armed Forces, which is “almost as bad as a criminal record”. Before leaving, the accused gay military is given a two-week psychiatric counselling to cure his “abnormal illness”.

If the gay suspect refuses to “cooperate“, there is nothing the SIU can do; in most cases, they have no proof whatsoever, only rumors, hearsays or list of names. However, a letter stating that the military is “suspected” of homosexuality is sent to his Base Commander with a copy in the suspect’s file which will follow him from Base to Base throughout his career, by now quite limited as his security clearance is also reduced from Top secret to Secret, or worse, to Confidential only.

While this obsessional “gay purge” in the Armed Forces was conducted in the name of National Security, during the entire period (1950-1992), not a single gay military has been suspected or accused of treason. Nevertheless, it is estimated that 9,000 militaries have been discharged from the three Services for being gay or lesbian (21). We do not know the number of RCMP agents also released for the same reasons.
 
In the Civil Service, the Memorandum on Sexual Deviation (1967), read in the Commons by Prime Minister Pearson, is applied, but with greater tolerance by the Deputy Minister of the Department who assets each case. Not so many gay employees have been terminated—even at the Dept of External Affairs which had quite a few but discreet gay diplomats. When a “suspected gay” is considered for an embassy posting, he is submitted to another security screening, and his phone is bugged for one week. At the medical exam, the physician will ask politely if he can examine the anus. Finally, the “gay suspect” is sent to a psychiatrist to determine if his “character weakness” is a security risk for an overseas posting.

Effect of social liberalization
In 1992, 2Lt Michelle Douglas sued the Canadian Armed Forces for discrimination. In October 1992, just before Douglas' legal challenge went to trial, the Canadian military abandoned its policy banning gays and lesbians and settled the case. Order CFAO-19-20 was repealed, thereby allowing gay, lesbian, bisexual and transgender (LGBT) people to serve in the Canadian Armed Forces. While this marked the official end of what was known as the LGBT Purge, 2SLGBTQI+ service members and public servants faced overt discrimination throughout the 1990s.

A series of provincial and territorial court decisions beginning in 2003 ruled in favour of the legality of gay marriage, and a national law to that effect was passed by Canada's parliament in 2005 by the Paul Martin Liberal government.

Reconciliation
In 2018, the Ross, Roy Satalic vs Canada class action lawsuit  was settled. This followed the apology in the House of Commons by Prime Minister Justin Trudeau and leaders of each party on 28 November 2017. The settlement provided compensation to individuals who faced discrimination in the Canadian Armed Forces as well as other civil service members. The settlement also established a multi million dollar fund, the LGBT Purge Fund, to complete a number of reconciliation and memorialization measures, including the Canada Pride Citation.

Openly Gay Members
Davin Hoekstra was the first to come out nationally as a gay soldier in the Spring 1998 edition of Fab National Magazine. His interview with award-winning journalist Michael Rowe garnered global attention. Davin was subsequently interviewed by Kathleen Petty on CBC Newsworld, Arlene Bynon on Global and his story appeared in newspapers across the country.

Same-sex unions in the military

In 2004, Jason Stewart was the first member of Canada's military to marry a same-sex partner. In May 2005, Canada's first military gay wedding took place at Nova Scotia's Canadian Forces Base Greenwood. Officials described the ceremony as low-key but touching. A similar wedding has since taken place between two male Royal Canadian Mounted Police officers. Today, the Canadian Forces recognizes same-sex marital and common-law unions, and affords them the same benefits offered to all married or common-law serving members.

Participation in Pride parades
During the Divers-Cité Pride parades 1999–2002 in Montreal, a military member and an ex-military member held the banner of the informal grouping MGL, dissolved in 2004 due to the lack of participation of the military community LGBT. During the 2006 Halifax Pride parade, one member of the Canadian Forces marched in the parade, helping to carry the large pride flag. In the 2008 Toronto Pride parade, ten members of the Canadian Forces marched for the first time as a group. One month later, twelve gay and straight members of the Canadian Forces marched in the Vancouver Pride Parade. Lt(N) Steven Churm said, "The message to the public is that the Canadian Forces is an employer of choice."[6] A Facebook group exists where CF LGBT members network and organise as a support group, do socials, as well as plan for various Canadian Pride events dating back to his initial collaboration with Lt (N) Churm at Toronto Pride 2009. In 2015, the Canadian Armed Forces were in the Edmonton Pride Parade with a LAV, Bison, and MRT.

References

(1) Full text of the CFAO-19-20 at https://montreal.ctvnews.ca/view-the-document-cfao-19-20-banned-homosexuality-in-the-canadian-military-1.3010604
(18) Samuel Mason, My Father, the Gay Purge of the Canadian Military, and Me in Vice, 28 November 2017. The father was an SIU agent while his own son was a gay civil servant. Full interview on the SIU procedures.
(19) Emotional scars remain for gay ex-military subjected to interrogations, dismissals at https://montreal.ctvnews.ca/emotional-scars-remain-for-gay-ex-military-subjected-to-interrogations-dismissals-1.3005365
(20) LGBT ban in the military: Ex-soldiers share their painful stories at https://montreal.ctvnews.ca/lgbt-ban-in-the-military-ex-soldiers-share-their-painful-stories-1.3005266
(21) The New York Times (International edition), 25–26 November 2017, p. 5

Further reading
 Gary Kinsman and Patrizia Gentile, The Canadian War on Queers: National Security as Sexual Regulation, UBC Press, 2010. 554 pp.
 Goldberg, Suzanne B. "Open Service and Our Allies: A Report on the Inclusion of Openly Gay and Lesbian Servicemembers in U.S. Allies' Armed Forces,"  William & Mary Journal of Women & Law (2011) v 17 pp 547–90  online
 Allan Bérubé, Coming Out Under Fire. The History of Gay Men and Women in World War II. University of North Carolina Press, 2010 ed., 416pp.
 Randy Shilts, Conduct Unbecoming. Gays & Lesbians in the U.S. Military [1778-1990]. New York, Open Road, 1993. 721pp. 
These two American books describe hundreds of cases of military personnel interrogated for being gay or lesbian. The devious and illegal techniques used by the American MPs have inspired the SIU for the interrogation of gay suspects in Canada.

External links
 Watch Open Secrets, a National Film Board of Canada documentary on homosexuals in the Canadian military during World War II
 "Witch-hunt in the military" CBC News video about past policy of Canadian Forces Special Investigations Unit against gays and lesbians
 www.thecanadianencyclopedia.ca/en/article/canada-s-cold-war-purge-of-lgbtq-from-the-military

Military
Canada
Canadian Armed Forces